Mason Grady (born 29 March 2002) is a Welsh international rugby union player, currently playing for URC side Cardiff Rugby. His preferred position is centre or wing.

Club career
Grady signed his first professional contract for Cardiff in September 2020. Grady played in the Welsh Premier Division for both Cardiff RFC and Pontypridd RFC. On his Cardiff debut, he became the second youngest player to represent the club, at 17 years and seven months.

He made his Cardiff Blues debut in Round 8 of the 2020–21 Pro14 against Glasgow Warriors. Near the end of the season, Grady suffered a serious knee injury, which ultimately ruled him out for a year. Grady began to feature more prominently for Cardiff in the 2022–2023 season, following his recovery from the injury. He scored in back to back European fixtures, against Brive and Newcastle, as Cardiff made the knockouts of the 2022–23 Challenge Cup.

He was part of the Cardiff RFC team which won the 2021–22 Indigo Group Premiership.

International career 
Grady has represented Wales U18 and Wales U20. He was selected for Wales U20 while still eligible for the U18 side, playing in the 2020 Six Nations Under 20s Championship, until the tournament was postponed due to the COVID-19 pandemic. Due to injury, Grady did not participate in the 2022 Six Nations Under 20s Championship. Upon returning to fitness, Grady was selected for the 2022 U20 Summer Series. He scored a try against South Africa U20 in the final.

On 3 November 2022, Grady was called up by Wales to train with the squad ahead of the Autumn Nations Series.

On 17 January 2023, Grady was called up by Wales again, for the 2023 Six Nations squad. He made his debut on 25 February 2023, starting at outside centre against England.

Personal life 
Grady comes from an athletic family. Julie, his mother, played basketball for wales for 20 years and the club side Rhondda Rebels, she also represented Wales once in the Commonwealth Games.  His brother Ashton has also represented Wales in basketball; his older brother, Cory Allen, is a retired Welsh international, and also played as a centre. Grady himself played basketball, representing Wales U16.

Grady attended Ysgol Gymraeg Bro Morgannwg.

References

External links

Cardiff Rugby profile
Wales profile

2002 births
Living people
Welsh rugby union players
Cardiff Rugby players
Rugby union centres
Rugby union wings
Wales international rugby union players